"Old Days" is a song written by James Pankow for the group Chicago and recorded for their album Chicago VIII (1975).  It was the second single released from that album with lead vocals by Peter Cetera.

Background
Pankow has said that the song is a nostalgic piece about his childhood:
"It touches on key phrases that, although they date me, are pretty right-on in terms of images of my childhood. 'The Howdy Doody Show' on television and collecting baseball cards and comic books."

Pankow told group biographer James William Ruhlmann that the group stopped performing the song live because Cetera refused to sing it, unironically calling the lyrics "corny".

Cash Box praised the "great horn work," "Danny Seraphine's fine drum parts," and Terry Kath's "great guitar licks." Record World said that Chicago's "wall-to-wall sound returns, this time abetted by Pat Williams strings, on a side that's destined to be this year's 'Saturday in the Park.'" "

Chart performance
"Old Days" reached #5 on the U.S. Billboard Hot 100 and #3 on the Easy Listening chart.

Weekly charts

Year-end charts

Personnel
 Peter Cetera - lead vocals, bass
 Robert Lamm - piano, Hammond organ, harpsichord, backing vocals
 Terry Kath - fuzzed wah-wah electric guitars, backing vocals
 Danny Seraphine - drums
 Laudir de Oliveira - percussion
 James Pankow - trombone, backing vocals
 Lee Loughnane - trumpet
 Walter Parazaider - tenor saxophone
Additional Personnel
 Patrick Williams - string orchestrations

Later uses in popular culture
"Old Days" is featured on the soundtrack of the movie Starsky & Hutch (2004). 
The band also reworked the song in 2009 to serve as the theme for the "Monsters in the Morning" show airing on Comcast SportsNet Chicago.

References

1974 songs
1975 singles
Chicago (band) songs
Songs written by James Pankow
Song recordings produced by James William Guercio
Columbia Records singles
List songs
Songs about nostalgia